A referendum was held on 9 December 1950 in the Australian state of Western Australia on the topic of prohibition. It was the fourth referendum on the topic of liquor licensing, and the second put to voters with the same wording. The proposal that alcohol should be prohibited was rejected by a majority of voters.

Overview
The referendum was conducted pursuant to Section 87(e) of the Licensing Act 1911, which had been added by an amending act in 1922 and allowed for five-yearly referendums. However, none had been conducted since the 1925 poll.

Referendum results 
Question: Do you agree with the proposal that prohibition shall come into force in Western Australia?

Aftermath 
No further polls were held on the topic of liquor licensing, and Section 87 of the Licensing Act was repealed in 1959.

References 

1950
1950 elections in Australia
1950 referendums
Alcohol in Australia
Prohibition referendums
1950s in Western Australia
December 1950 events in Australia